2-Methyl-2-pentanol (IUPAC name: 2-methylpentan-2-ol) is an organic chemical compound. It can be added to a gas chromatograph to help distinguish between branched compounds, especially alcohols. Its presence in urine can be used to test for exposure to 2-methylpentane. As with many other short-chain alcohols, 2-methyl-2-pentanol can produce intoxication and sedative effects similar to those of ethanol, though it is more irritating to mucous membranes and generally more toxic to the body.

See also 
 2-Methyl-2-butanol
 3-Methyl-3-pentanol

References 

Hexanols
Tertiary alcohols